Semlac is a commune located in Arad County, in the western part of Romania, near the border with Hungary, is situated in the south-western part of the Arad Plateau, in the large valley of the Mureș River. Its territory occupies .

Population
According to the 2011 census, the commune has 3,667 inhabitants, out of which 78.4% are ethnic Romanians, 8.4% Roma, 2.67% Hungarians, and 2.32% Germans.

History
It is first mentioned in 1326. It was ravaged by the Turks in 1552, but later survived the occupation. In 1910, out of 5,676 inhabitants, there were 2,475 Romanians, 1,899 Germans, 601 Hungarians, 278 Slovaks and 272 Ruthenians. Until the Treaty of Trianon, Arad County belonged to the district of Pecica. In 1992, out of 3787 inhabitants, there were 2947 Romanians, 286 Germans, 233 Gypsies, 181 Hungarians and 140 others. To the south of the village, on the banks of the Mureş, lay the medieval village of Deușu, which has left no trace. The economy of the commune is mainly agrarian, the locality is well known in the region as an important grain-bearing vegetable-growing place. The livestock is based on pig and cattle raising.

Tourism
Semlac contains a nature park.

Natives
Helmuth Duckadam (born 1959), goalkeeper
 (1895–1958), lawyer, executed by the Communist authorities
 (1881–1960), priest and teacher, delegate at the Great National Assembly of Alba Iulia of 1918
Otmar Szafnauer (born 1964), former CEO and team principal of the BWT Alpine F1 Team

References

Communes in Arad County
Localities in Crișana